The 2007 FIBA Americas Championships later known as the FIBA AmeriCup (or The Tournament of the Americas), was a basketball tournament held at Thomas & Mack Center, in Las Vegas, from August 22, to September 2. It was the thirteenth staging of the FIBA AmeriCup.

The tournament was originally going to be hosted in Venezuela. However, the Venezuelan federation failed to pay a $1.5 million fee, as of August 31, 2006. As such, their hosting privileges were taken away.

Several countries had shown interest in hosting the tournament, including: United States, Chile, Argentina, and Puerto Rico. The United States had not hosted it since 1992, Chile had never hosted it, Argentina had held it last in 2001, and Puerto Rico had last hosted in 2003.

Venues 
All games were played at the Thomas & Mack Center, which was used earlier in the year for the 2007 NBA All-Star Game.

Qualification 

Eight teams qualified during the qualification tournaments held in their respective zones in 2006; two teams (USA and Canada) qualified automatically since they are the only members of the North America zone.
 North America: , 
 Caribbean and Central America:, 

The tournament draw took place Wednesday, March 21, in Las Vegas. The teams were split into 5 pots; those drawn first went to Group A, those drawn last went to Group B.

The draw split the tournament into two groups:<ref name="Friedman">Brad Friedman, "FIBA Americas Championship 2007 Preview", NBA.Com, Mar 21 2007.</ref>

Group A

 Mexico

Group B

 Format 
 The top four teams from each group advance to the quarterfinals.
 Results and standings among teams within the same group are carried over.
 The top four teams at the quarterfinals advance to the semifinals (1 vs. 4, 2 vs. 3).
 The winners in the knockout semifinals advance to the Final, where both are guaranteed of berths in the 2008 Olympics. The losers figure in a third-place playoff. The semifinal losers and the 5th best team in the quarterfinals are assured of berths to the FIBA World Olympic Qualifying Tournament 2008

 Tie-breaking criteria 
Ties are broken via the following the criteria, with the first option used first, all the way down to the last option:
 Head to head results
 Goal average (not the goal difference) between the tied teams
 Goal average of the tied teams for all teams in its group

 Squads 

 Preliminary round Times given below are in United States Pacific Daylight Time (UTC-7).''

Group A 

|}

Group B 

|}

Quarterfinals 

The top four teams in Group A and Group B advanced to the Quarterfinal group. Then each team played the four from the other group to complete a full round robin. Records from the preliminary groups carried over, but only against teams that also advanced.

The top four teams advanced to the semifinals. The fifth-place team (Canada) did not continue competing for the Americas Championship, but qualified for the FIBA World Olympic Qualifying Tournament 2008.

Standings 

|}

Medal round 
The teams that played in the Championship Game both automatically qualified for the 2008 Olympics. The teams that played in the 3rd Place Game both automatically qualified for the FIBA World Olympic Qualifying Tournament 2008.

Semifinals

Third place game

Final

Awards

Statistical leaders

Individual Tournament Highs 

Points

Rebounds

Assists

Steals

Blocks

Minutes

Individual Game Highs

Team Tournament Highs 

Offensive PPG

Defensive PPG

Rebounds

Assists

Steals

Blocks

Team Game highs

Final standings

References 

 
FIBA AmeriCup
2007–08 in American basketball
International basketball competitions hosted by the United States
Basketball competitions in the Las Vegas Valley
2007–08 in North American basketball
2007–08 in South American basketball
2007 in sports in Nevada